Elimane Oumar Cissé (born 12 March 1995) is a Senegalese professional footballer who plays as a midfielder for Moroccan club US Touarga and the Senegal national football team.

Personal life 
Cissé was born in Dakar, Senegal.

In October 2019, Cissé married his wife, Seynabou. Because the 2019 Canadian Premier League season was still going on, he could not return to Senegal and communicated with his wife via WhatsApp during the ceremony.

Club career

Forge FC
On 26 February 2019, Cissé signed with new Canadian Premier League side Forge FC. In their first season, Forge qualified for the CPL finals against Cavalry FC. Cissé would play both legs, and with Forge up 1–0 on aggregate, he assisted a David Choinière goal during stoppage time in the second leg to seal the championship for the club.

Cissé left the club following the 2021 season.

US Touarga
Cissé joined Moroccan club US Touarga and helped the club secure promotion to the top-tier Botola Pro in 2022.

International career
Cissé first represented the Senegal U20 national team at the 2015 African U-20 Championship. He appeared in all five matches for Senegal, including the final, which they lost 1–0 to Nigeria. Cissé was subsequently called up for the 2015 FIFA U-20 World Cup, where he started six matches in a surprise fourth-place performance.

Cissé made his senior international debut for Senegal on 10 February 2016, in a friendly against Mexico. In the 2022 African Nations Championship, he appeared in three matches for Senegal en route to the championship.

Honours

Club
Forge FC
Canadian Premier League: 2019, 2020

International
Senegal
African Nations Championship: 2022

References

External links

1995 births
Living people
Association football midfielders
Senegalese footballers
Footballers from Dakar
Senegalese expatriate footballers
Expatriate soccer players in Canada
Senegalese expatriate sportspeople in Canada
Senegalese expatriate sportspeople in Morocco
Diambars FC players
Forge FC players
Senegal Premier League players
Canadian Premier League players
Senegal youth international footballers
Senegal international footballers
Expatriate footballers in Morocco